Euphorbia exigua, dwarf spurge or small spurge, is a species of Euphorbia in the spurge family (Euphorbiaceae), native to Europe, northern Africa and the Near East, and invasive worldwide.

References

exigua
Plants described in 1753
Taxa named by Carl Linnaeus
Flora of Malta